The Morgan–Copp–Mervau Building, also known as the Corner Store, is a commercial building located at 101 North Mill Street in Northport, Michigan.  It was listed on the National Register of Historic Places in 2000.

History

The Morgan–Copp–Mervau Building was built in three sections.  The first, a single-story building fronting on Nagonaba, was constructed in 1880 as a grocery and dry goods store.  The store was owned by Northport native N. C. Morgan and his wife Abbie Voice. An attached two-story section was built on the rear in 1881-83; this served as the Morgans' home.  The Morgans moved to Sault Ste Marie in 1887.  The two-story section was extended to front onto Mill Street some time before 1905; this section was used for quite some time as Mervau's drugstore.  A third section, built diagonally to front onto the Nagonaba/Mill intersection, was built in 1927/28.

In 1996/97, the building was rehabilitated and restored to its original appearance.

Description
The  Morgan–Copp–Mervau Building consists of three sections: a single-story false-front clapboard-clad section fronting on Nagonaba, a two-story false-front clapboard-clad section fronting on Mill, and a single-story cedar stickwork addition fronting onto the Nagonaba/Mill intersection.  The first two sections form an ell, with the third section oriented diagonally to the first two.

References

Commercial buildings on the National Register of Historic Places in Michigan
Victorian architecture in Michigan
Buildings and structures in Leelanau County, Michigan
National Register of Historic Places in Leelanau County, Michigan
Western false front architecture
Commercial buildings completed in 1880